Fort Meade is a former United States Army post located just east of Sturgis, South Dakota. The fort was active from 1878 to 1944; the cantonment is currently home to a Veterans Health Administration hospital and South Dakota Army National Guard training facilities. Much of the former reservation is now managed by the Bureau of Land Management as the Fort Meade Recreation Area. It is also home of Fort Meade National Cemetery. Fort Meade was established in 1878 to protect illegal white settlements on the Great Sioux Reservation in the northern Black Hills, especially the nearby gold mining area around Deadwood. Several stage and freighting routes passed through Fort Meade en route to Deadwood.

For most of the past 130 years, there has been some military presence at Fort Meade, near Sturgis, South Dakota.  Many cavalry and infantry units were stationed here including the 7th U.S. Cavalry after the Battle of the Little Bighorn; the Buffalo Soldiers of the 25th U.S. Infantry; the 4th U.S. Cavalry which saw the transition from horses to mechanization; and the 88th Glider Infantry Regiment during World War II. 

Fort Meade was designated a National Historic District on May 22, 1973, the first location in Meade County, South Dakota, to be placed on the National Register of Historic Places.

Establishment
In the Fort Laramie Treaty of 1868, the Black Hills of South Dakota were set aside for the use of the Lakota people as part of the Great Sioux Reservation. However, the discovery of gold in the region in the 1870s prompted numerous whites to illegally enter the reservation; these trespassers demanded protection from the United States Army. A temporary United States military camp was established in August, 1876, on Spring Creek a little north of Bear Butte (known to the Cheyenne as Náhkȯhévóse, not to be confused with the sacred Cheyenne mountain Nóávóse/Nóvávóse—″Gift Butte″ or ″Offer Butte″, the Bear Butte northwest of Rapid City, South Dakota, where Sweet Medicine received the covenant of the Sacred Arrows, and where Cheyennes go to pray and fast), and named Camp Sturgis, in honor of 2nd Lt. James G. Sturgis, who was killed at the Battle of the Little Bighorn. During the occupation of this camp, the present site of Fort Meade, situated just outside the eastern foothills of the Black Hills, and on the south side of Bear Butte Creek, was selected and located as a permanent United States military post, which was established and garrisoned on August 31, 1878.

The new post replaced Camp J.C. Sturgis, started in July 1878, about two miles northwest of nearby Bear Butte, was first named Camp Ruhlen for Lt. George Ruhlen, 17th U.S. Infantry quartermaster officer who supervised the building of the post. It was established by Major Henry M. Lazelle, 1st U.S. Infantry, and companies D and H of the 11th U.S. Infantry on a site selected by Lieutenant General Philip H. Sheridan, on the east side of Bear Butte Creek, in the Black Hills, fourteen miles northeast of the town of Deadwood, South Dakota.

General Order No. 27, issued at Department of Dakota Headquarters, announced that the Secretary of War had designated the post "Fort Meade" in honor of Major General George G. Meade, of Civil War fame. The first commander was Colonel Samuel D. Sturgis, 7th Cavalry.

The work of building the post, for which an appropriation of $100,000.00 had been made, was begun on August 28, 1878, and completed in August 1879. The original appropriation not proving sufficient to meet the cost of the necessary buildings an additional appropriation of $11,000, and later a special appropriation of $13,000, was made for post hospital.

History
According to information obtained from an officer in the Eighth Cavalry Regiment, Fort Meade has been garrisoned, since its occupation, as follows:

The original garrison consisted of troops E and M, Seventh Cavalry, and companies F and K, First Infantry, with Major H. M. Lazelle, of the First United States Infantry in command. In June 1879, the garrison was reinforced by the arrival of the band and Troops C and G, Seventh Cavalry, and on July 10, 1879, by troops A and H, Seventh Cavalry, at which time Col. S.D. Sturgis assumed command of the post. In September 1879, Companies D and H, First Infantry, from Fort Sully, joined, increasing the garrison to four companies of infantry and six troops of cavalry.

On May 13, 1880, Companes D, F, H, and K of the infantry left for Texas, and were replaced by Companies A, D, H, and K, Twenty-fifth Infantry (colored), with Capt. D.D. Van Valzah, Twenty-fifth Infantry, in temporary command, Col. Sturgis being absent on leave. On May 19, 1881, Col. Sturgis resumed command, but relinquished in June, going to Washington, D.C., to take charge of the Soldiers' Home. From that time the post was commanded successively by Capt. Van Vajzah, Twenty-fifth Infantry, Major Edward Ball, Seventh Cavalry, and Col. Joseph G. Tilford, Seventh Cavalry, until July 1886, when Col. James W. Forsyth was assigned to the command and remained until June, 1887.

In 1887, the four companies of the Twenty-fifth Infantry were replaced by four companies of the Third Infantry. In June 1888, the Seventh Cavalry Regiment was sent to Fort Riley, Kansas, and the Third Infantry to some other post, when Fort Meade was regarrisoned by the Eighth Cavalry Regiment, consisting of eight troops under the command of Col. Elmer Otis. In January 1891, Col. Otis was superseded by Col. C. H. Carleton, who was retired from active service in June 1897, when Col. John M. Bacon took command of the garrison.

Soon after the beginning of the Spanish–American War, Col. Bacon was ordered to St. Paul, Minnesota, leaving the post in charge of Major Robert McGregor. Pending the war, the Eighth Cavalry Regiment, which had occupied the post for ten years, was broken up and scattered, the last troops leaving on October 6, 1898, for Huntsville, Alabama, from where they were to be sent to join the army of occupation in Cuba. The garrison in October 1898, consisted of two troops of the First United States Cavalry, transferred there from the battlefields of San Juan Hill and El Caney.

Home of Comanche
In June 1879, the horse named Comanche, who survived the Battle of the Little Bighorn, was brought to Fort Meade by the Seventh Cavalry Regiment. There he was kept like a prince until 1888 when he was taken to Fort Riley, Kansas.  He died at Fort Riley a few years later and was buried with military honors. Shortly thereafter the horse's remains were sent to a taxidermist, and in the early 1900s Comanche was displayed at the Natural History Museum at the University of Kansas in Lawrence, Kansas. A restoration of the display was completed in 2005.

Home of the National Anthem

It was here that the "Star Spangled Banner" first became the official music for the military retreat ceremony, long before it became the National Anthem. In 1892, the post commander Colonel Caleb H. Carlton, 8th Cavalry, began the custom of playing the "Star Spangled Banner" at military ceremonies and requested that all people rise and pay it proper respect long before it became the National Anthem.

See also
 Department of Dakota forts

Notes

References
 Lee, Robert, Fort Meade, the peace keeper post on the Dakota Frontier, 1878-1944, Old Fort Meade Museum & Historic Research Association, 1987.
 Lee, Robert, Fort Meade and the Black Hills, University of Nebraska Press, 1991.
 Sago, Roberta and Lee Stroschine, Fort Meade: Peacekeeper of the Black Hills, Arcadia Publishing, 2018.

External links

 Fort Meade National Cemetery
 Fort Meade Recreation Area
 Brief Descriptions of Dakota Territory Forts
 Fort Meade
 Fort Meade: From Frontier Post to High-Tech Military and Modern Medicine

Buildings and structures in Meade County, South Dakota
Meade
Pre-statehood history of South Dakota
Meade
National Register of Historic Places in Meade County, South Dakota
1878 establishments in Dakota Territory